Jiao River may refer to:

 Jiao River (Shandong) (胶河)
 Jiao River (Zhejiang) (椒江)